Plan B Entertainment, Inc., more commonly known as Plan B, is an American production company founded in November in 2001 by Brad Pitt, Brad Grey, Kristin Hahn and Jennifer Aniston. In 2005, after Pitt and Aniston divorced, Grey became the CEO of Paramount Pictures and Pitt became the sole owner of the company. The president of the company was for many years Dede Gardner, but she and Pitt named Jeremy Kleiner co-president with Gardner in 2013. Three of the production company's movies, The Departed, 12 Years a Slave and Moonlight, have won the Academy Award for Best Picture.

Pitt, Gardner and Kleiner received the Producers Guild of America's David O. Selznick Achievement Award in Theatrical Motion Pictures in 2020.

This name was previously used for an unrelated production company that was headed by Bruce Berman from 1996 to 1997.

On October 30, 2022, it was reported that Mediawan was in talks to acquiring in a significant stake of the studio.

Production deals

Active
Metro-Goldwyn-Mayer (since 2020)
Warner Bros. Pictures (2002–2005) (since 2020)
Amazon Studios (since 2020)

Former
Annapurna Pictures (2017–2020)
New Regency (2014–2017)
RatPac Entertainment (2014–2017)
Paramount Pictures (2005–2013)

Films

2000s

2010s

2020s

Upcoming
Landscape with Invisible Hand (2023)
Mickey 17 (2024)
Animal (TBA)
Black Hole (TBA)
The Husbands (TBA)
The Nickel Boys (TBA)
Untitled Beetlejuice sequel (TBA)
Untitled Lee Isaac Chung film (TBA)
Untitled Chris Cornell documentary (TBA)
Untitled Joseph Kosinski film (TBA)
Once Upon a Time in Shaolin (TBA)
The Water Dancer (TBA)
Wolves (TBA)

Television

2000s

2010s

2020s

Upcoming 
The Three-Body Problem (TBA)

References

Further reading

External links
 Brad Pitt as a Producer on Box Office Mojo

Entertainment companies based in California
Film production companies of the United States
Companies based in Beverly Hills, California
American companies established in 2001
Mass media companies established in 2001
2001 establishments in California
Television production companies of the United States
American film studios
Jennifer Aniston
Brad Pitt